St Mary's Church otherwise known as the Parish of St Mary the Virgin, Barnsley is a grade II* listed active Parish Church in the town of Barnsley, in the Metropolitan Borough of Barnsley, South Yorkshire, England. Built in 1400, the church is located on Church Lane and is directly next to the college and town hall. The church is used for hosting religious services and Barnsley College use it for music performances and events. The church is the main parish church in Barnsley and local suburbs.

References

External links

Grade II* listed churches in South Yorkshire
Churches completed in 1400